The 2016 season is Strømsgodset's tenth season back in the Tippeligaen since their relegation at the end of the 2001 season.

Squad

Out on loan

Transfers

Winter

In:

Out:

Summer

In:

Out:

Friendlies

Competitions

Tippeligaen

Results summary

Results by round

Results

Table

Norwegian Cup

UEFA Europa League

Qualifying rounds

Squad statistics

Appearances and goals

|-
|colspan="14"|Players away from Strømsgodset on loan:
|-
|colspan="14"|Players who appeared for Strømsgodset no longer at the club:

|}

Goal scorers

Disciplinary record

References

Strømsgodset Toppfotball seasons
Stromsgodset